Kadawunu Poronduwa is a 1982 Sinhala drama film directed by Roy de Silva and produced by his wife Sumana Amarasinghe. It is a remake of the first Sinhala film Kadawunu Poronduwa. The film stars Vijaya Kumaratunga and Sumana Amarasinghe in lead roles whereas Eddie Jayamanne, Joe Abeywickrama and Ruby de Mel in suppiortive roles. It also marks the film debut of comedian Sunil Hettiarachchi as well as final appearance of Eddie Jayamanne in cinema.

Reception
The film received generally positive reviews and was the most popular film of 1982 in Sri Lanka. For the latter accomplishment, it was presented with a presidential award.

Cast
 Vijaya Kumaranatunga as Samson 
 Sumana Amarasinghe as Ranjani
 Eddie Jayamanne as Manappuwa 
 Joe Abeywickrama as Hemapala
 Ruby de Mel as Jayasena Hamine
 Mabel Blythe as Josy Baba
 Sonia Disa as Tekla
 Victor Wickramage as Victor Moragoda
 Henry Jayasena
 Wijeratne Warakagoda as Psych ward nurse
 Freddie Silva as Sewaris 'Unnah'
 Don Sirisena as Tamil Priest
 Lilian Edirisinghe as Debtor
 B. S. Perera as Mudalali
 Sunil Hettiarachchi as Simio
 Gemini Kantha as Song performer
 Eddie Junior as Sinhala debtor

Soundtrack
The movie features songs sung by Rukmani Devi (from the original film), Latha Walpola, Stanley Mallawarachchi, Victor Ratnayake, Neela Wickramasinghe, Eddie Jayamanne (from the original film) and Sujatha Attanayake.

External links
Sri Lanka Cinema Database

1982 films
1980s Sinhala-language films
Remakes of Sri Lankan films